Milax is a genus of air-breathing, keeled, land slugs. These are shell-less terrestrial gastropod mollusks in the family Milacidae.

This is the type genus of the family.

Species
Species within the genus Milax include:
 Milax aegaeicus
 Milax altenai
 Milax caucasicus
 Milax cyprius
 Milax gagates - the greenhouse slug. This is the type species of the genus Milax
 Milax nigricans
 Milax ochraceus
 Milax parvulus
 Milax verrucosus

References

External links
 Barr R. A. 1926. "Memoirs: Some Observations on the Pedal Gland of Milax". Quarterly Journal of Microscopical Science, Vol s2-70, 647-667.

Milacidae
Taxa named by John Edward Gray